Srećko Ilić (born 2 October 1966 in Sarajevo) is a former Yugoslav football player. Ilić played for Željezničar Sarajevo and later, after the war broke, he emigrated to Slovenia where he played for several clubs.

External links
PrvaLiga profile 

1966 births
Living people
Footballers from Sarajevo
Yugoslav footballers
FK Željezničar Sarajevo players
Expatriate footballers in Slovenia
NK Mura players
ND Gorica players
Association football defenders